Abbeylara Gaelic Football Club is a Gaelic football club based in Abbeylara, County Longford, Ireland.

History
The Abbeylara club can trace its origins back to the Ballywillan Michael Davitts club (founded in 1889 and named after Michael Davitt) who competed in the first Longford Senior Football Championship in 1890 (also referred to as Abbeylara Davitts). During the 1891 Senior Football Championship, Ballywillan Michael Davitts changed its name to Ballywillan Faugh a'Ballaghs. The club went into decline thereafter as all GAA competition ceased in Longford (and across much of the country) due to the Parnell saga. 

The modern day Abbeylara club was first affiliated in 1928. 

A 'United Gaels' amalgamation representing Granard and Abbeylara reached the final of the Longford Senior Football Championship in 1947. 

The club crest depicts the ruins of the nearby Abbey of Lerha.

Abbeylara reached their first county final in 1998.

Abbeylara have won the Longford Senior Football Championship twice, in 2000 and 2006. They have been defeated in the Longford final in 2015, 2016, 2017 and 2018.

The Hand of Dalton = 2010

References

Gaelic games clubs in County Longford
Gaelic football clubs in County Longford